The Jeff Russel Memorial Trophy is a Canadian football award recognizing the most outstanding football player of the Quebec Student Sport Federation (RESQ)

The trophy was originally presented to the player who best exemplified skill, sportsmanship, and courage in the Interprovincial Rugby Football Union. In 1973, it became the award to the Most Outstanding Player of the Canadian Football League's East Division and either the winner of this trophy or the winner of the Jeff Nicklin Memorial Trophy from the West would go on to win the CFL's Most Outstanding Player Award. The trophy was donated to the Canadian Rugby Union in 1928, to honour former Montreal player, Jeff Russel, who was killed in 1926, while repairing damaged electric lines for the Montreal Power Company. The trophy was officially retired in 1994 at the request of the Russel family, with the Terry Evanshen Trophy replacing the Jeff Russel Memorial Trophy as the official trophy to be awarded to the Most Outstanding Player of the East Division that same year.

In 2003, it was re-established for recognizing the players in the Quebec conference of U Sports football and the winner is nominated for the national Hec Crighton Trophy.

List of winners

CFL East Division / IRFU 
Awarded to the player best exemplifying skill, sportsmanship, and courage until 1972, then to The Most Outstanding Player in the East Conference/Division from 1973 until 1993.

 1993 - Matt Dunigan (QB), Winnipeg Blue Bombers
 1992 - Angelo Snipes (LB), Ottawa Rough Riders
 1991 - Robert Mimbs (RB), Winnipeg Blue Bombers
 1990 - Mike "Pinball" Clemons (RB), Toronto Argonauts
 1989 - Tony Champion (WR), Hamilton Tiger-Cats
 1988 - Earl Winfield (WR), Hamilton Tiger-Cats
 1987 - Tom Clements (QB), Winnipeg Blue Bombers
 1986 - James Hood (WR), Montreal Alouettes
 1985 - Ken Hobart (QB), Hamilton Tiger-Cats
 1984 - Rufus Crawford (RB), Hamilton Tiger-Cats
 1983 - Terry Greer (WR), Toronto Argonauts
 1982 - Condredge Holloway (QB), Toronto Argonauts
 1981 - Tom Clements (QB), Hamilton Tiger-Cats
 1980 - Gerry Dattilio (QB), Montreal Alouettes
 1979 - David Green (RB), Montreal Alouettes
 1978 - Tony Gabriel (TE), Ottawa Rough Riders
 1977 - Jimmy Edwards (RB), Hamilton Tiger-Cats
 1976 - Jimmy Edwards (RB), Hamilton Tiger-Cats
 1975 - Johnny Rodgers (RB), Montreal Alouettes
 1974 - Johnny Rodgers (RB), Montreal Alouettes
 1973 - John Harvey (RB), Montreal Alouettes
 1972 - Garney Henley (WR), Hamilton Tiger-Cats
 1971 - Mel Profit (TE), Toronto Argonauts
 1970 - Bill Symons (RB), Toronto Argonauts
 1969 - Russ Jackson (QB), Ottawa Rough Riders
 1968 - Larry Fairholm (DB), Montreal Alouettes
 1967 - Ron Stewart (RB), Ottawa Rough Riders
 1966 - Gene Gaines (DB), Ottawa Rough Riders
 1965 - Bernie Faloney (QB), Montreal Alouettes
 1964 - Dick Shatto (RB), Toronto Argonauts
 1963 - Garney Henley (DB), Hamilton Tiger-Cats
 1962 - George Dixon (RB), Montreal Alouettes
 1961 - Bobby Jack Oliver (DT), Montreal Alouettes
 1960 - Ron Stewart (RB), Ottawa Rough Riders
 1959 - Russ Jackson (QB), Ottawa Rough Riders
 1958 - Sam Etcheverry (QB), Montreal Alouettes
 1957 - Dick Shatto (RB), Toronto Argonauts
 1956 - Hal Patterson (DB/OE), Montreal Alouettes
 1955 - Avatus Stone (DB), Ottawa Rough Riders
 1954 - Sam Etcheverry (QB), Montreal Alouettes
 1953 - Bob Cunningham (FB), Ottawa Rough Riders
 1952 - Vince Mazza (OT), Hamilton Tiger-Cats
 1951 - Bruce Cummings (FW), Ottawa Rough Riders
 1950 - Don Loney (C), Ottawa Rough Riders
 1949 - Royal Copeland (RB), Toronto Argonauts
 1948 - Eric Chipper (OT), Ottawa Rough Riders
 1947 - Virgil Wagner (RB), Montreal Alouettes
 1946 - Joe Krol (RB), Toronto Argonauts
 1945 - George Fraser (OG), Ottawa Rough Riders
 1944 - no award given due to World War II
 1943 - no award given due to World War II
 1942 - no award given due to World War II
 1941 - Tony Golab (RB), Ottawa Rough Riders
 1940 - Andy Tommy (FW), Ottawa Rough Riders
 1939 - Bill Davies (FW), Montreal Royals
 1938 - Wes Cutler (DE), Toronto Argonauts
 1937 - Teddy Morris (FW), Toronto Argonauts
 1936 - Arnie Morrison (QB), Ottawa Rough Riders
 1935 - Abe Eliowitz (RB), Ottawa Rough Riders
 1934 - Ab Box (QB), Toronto Argonauts
 1933 - Huck Welch (RB), Montreal AAA Winged Wheelers
 1932 - Alex Denman (G/FW), Hamilton Tigers
 1931 - Gordie Perry (RB), Montreal AAA Winged Wheelers
 1930 - Frank Turville (RB), Toronto Argonauts
 1929 - J.H.D. "Red" Wilson (T), Toronto Argonauts
 1928 - Ernie Cox (C), Hamilton Tigers

Most Outstanding Player in the CFL's East Division prior to 1973
Note: Prior to 1973 the Canadian Football League East Division's Most Outstanding Player was not the winner of the Jeff Russel Memorial Trophy, which was a separate award.

 1972 – Garney Henley (WR), Hamilton Tiger-Cats
 1971 – Leon McQuay (RB), Toronto Argonauts
 1970 – Tommy Joe Coffey (WR), Hamilton Tiger-Cats
 1969 – Russ Jackson (QB), Ottawa Rough Riders
 1968 – Bill Symons (RB), Toronto Argonauts
 1967 – Tommy Joe Coffey (WR), Hamilton Tiger-Cats
 1966 – Russ Jackson (QB), Ottawa Rough Riders
 1965 – Garney Henley (DB), Hamilton Tiger-Cats
 1964 – Dick Shatto (RB), Toronto Argonauts
 1963 – Russ Jackson (QB), Ottawa Rough Riders

 1962 – George Dixon (RB), Montreal Alouettes
 1961 – Bernie Faloney (QB), Hamilton Tiger-Cats
 1960 – Cookie Gilchrist (RB), Toronto Argonauts
 1959 – Bernie Faloney (QB), Hamilton Tiger-Cats
 1958 – Dick Shatto (RB), Toronto Argonauts
 1957 – Hal Patterson (DB/OE), Montreal Alouettes
 1956 – Hal Patterson (DB/OE), Montreal Alouettes
 1955 – Dick Shatto (RB), Toronto Argonauts
 1954 – Alex Webster (RB), Montreal Alouettes
 1953 – Tex Coulter, Montreal & Gene Roberts, Ottawa

Quebec University Football League / Ontario-Quebec Intercollegiate Football Conference 
The Most Outstanding Player in the Quebec University Football League (QUFL). Beginning in 2003, the winner is awarded the Jeff Russel Memorial Trophy.

 2021 - Olivier Roy (QB), Concordia Stingers
 2020 - season cancelled - covid 19
 2019 - Adam Vance (QB), Concordia Stingers
 2018 - Hugh Richard (QB), Laval Rouge et Or
 2017 - Hugh Richard (QB), Laval Rouge et Or
 2016 - Samuel Caron (QB), Montreal Carabins
 2015 - Trenton Miller (QB), Concordia Stingers
 2014 - Hugh Richard (QB), Laval Rouge et Or
 2013 - Jordan Heather (QB), Bishop's Gaiters
 2012 - Rotrand Sené (RB), Montreal Carabins
 2011 - Simon Charbonneau-Campeau (WR), Sherbrooke Vert et Or
 2010 - Simon Charbonneau-Campeau (WR), Sherbrooke Vert et Or
 2009 - Benoit Groulx (QB), Laval Rouge et Or
 2008 - Benoit Groulx (QB), Laval Rouge et Or
 2007 - Jamall Lee (RB), Bishop's Gaiters
 2006 - Benoit Groulx (QB), Laval Rouge et Or
 2005 - Scott Syvret (QB), Concordia Stingers
 2004 - Jeronimo Huerta-Flores (RB), Laval Rouge et Or
 2003 - Mathieu Bertrand (QB), Laval Rouge et Or

References 

Defunct Canadian Football League trophies and awards
U Sports football trophies and awards
1928 establishments in Quebec